The Hundsheimer Berge (also Hainburger Berge) is a hill range located in Lower Austria and Burgenland, Austria next to the Devín Gate. It is the most southern part of the Devín Carpathians. Its highest peak is Hundsheimer Berg at  AMSL.

The mountains are densely forested, mostly with beech trees. The southern slopes are traditionally used by humans for agriculture and particularly wine-making. There are many vineyards in the area. South of Edelstal are wine cellars offering wine-tasting. The mountains feature the ruins of the Pottenburg Castle.

Major peaks:
 Hundsheimer Berg,  AMSL
 Weisses Kreuz,  AMSL
 Braunsberg,  AMSL
 Königswarte,  AMSL
 Pfaffenberg,  AMSL
 Teichberg,  AMSL
 Spitzerberg,  AMSL
 Hindlerberg,  AMSL
 Galgenbergl,  AMSL

External links

References 

Mountain ranges of Lower Austria
Mountain ranges of Europe